Kazembe Raymond (Ray) Kazembe (born 23 June 1969) is a Zimbabwean politician and currently serves as the Minister of Home Affairs and Cultural Heritage. He also served as Zimbabwe's Minister of Sport, Arts and Recreation and Zimbabwe's Minister of Justice, Legal and Parliamentary Affairs. He was elected to the National Assembly in 2013 as a Zanu-PF member for Mazowe West Constituency. Previous to his move to politics, Kazembe was the chairman of the Dynamos football club.

References

1969 births
Living people
ZANU–PF politicians
Members of the National Assembly of Zimbabwe
Government ministers of Zimbabwe
Justice ministers
Sports ministers
Football people in Zimbabwe
Interior ministers